The J, K and N class consisted of 24 destroyers built for the Royal Navy beginning in 1938. They were a return to a smaller vessel, with a heavier torpedo armament, after the  that emphasised guns over torpedoes. The ships were built in three flotillas or groups, each consisting of eight ships with names beginning with "J", "K" and "N". The flag superior of the pennant numbers changed from "F" to "G" in 1940.

The ships were modified throughout their wartime service, particularly their anti-aircraft (AA) guns; they were also fitted with radar.

Design history

The design was intended as a smaller follow-on from the preceding Tribal class, and incorporated one radical new idea that was a departure from all previous Royal Navy destroyer designs. That was the adoption of a two boiler room layout. This reduced hull length and allowed for a single funnel, both reducing the profile and increasing the arcs of fire of the light anti-aircraft (AA) weapons. However, this also increased vulnerability, as there were now two adjacent large compartments with the resultant risk of a single well-placed hit flooding both and resulting in a total loss of boiler power. This illustrates somewhat, the Admiralty's attitude to the expendable nature of destroyers. This is of course, as opposed to the three-boiler-room layout that was used starting with the F class in the early 1930s. Early ships also tended to use twin boiler rooms, which are still a great improvement over a single boiler room. In any case, destroyers are lightly armoured and fast vessels meant to survive by avoiding being hit at all. The odds of a single hit striking just the right spot to disable both boiler rooms simultaneously were considered remote enough to be worth risking in exchange for the benefits given by a two-room layout. During prewar trials "...On a light displacement Jackal attained 37.492 knots, on the Arran mile in 60 fathoms, 34.37 knots deep. Jupiter in 75 fathoms made 33.835 knots light, 33.045 knots deep displacement."

A significant advancement in construction techniques was developed by naval architect Albert Percy Cole. Instead of going for transverse frame sections which were unnecessarily strong, but held together by weak longitudinals, Cole opted for extra strong longitudinals and weaker transverse frames.

Another advancement was changes to the bow design. The bow form was also modified from that of the preceding Tribal-class design; the clipper bow was replaced by a straight stem with increased sheer. This change was not a success and as a consequence, these ships were very wet forwards. This shortcoming was rectified from the S class onward by returning to the earlier form.

The armament was based on that of the Tribals, but replaced one twin QF 4.7 in (120 mm) Mark XII (L/45) gun mount with an additional bank of torpedo tubes. These mountings were capable of 40° elevation and 340° of training. Curiously, 'X' mounting was positioned such that the blind 20° arc was across the stern, rather than the more logical forward position where fire was obscured by the bridge and masts anyway. This meant that they were unable to fire dead astern. With the tubes now 'pentad', a heavy load of 10 Mk.IX torpedoes could be carried. AA armament remained the same, consisting of a quadruple QF 2 pdr gun Mark VIII and a pair of quadruple 0.5 in Vickers machine guns. Armament was further improved by replacing the quadruple machine guns with 20 mm Oerlikons. These ships, when completed, had a comparatively heavy close range AA armament. Fire control arrangements also differed from the Tribals, and the dedicated high-angle (H/A) rangefinder director was not fitted, instead only a  rangefinder was carried behind the nominally dual purpose Director Control Tower (DCT). In the event, the rangefinder was heavily modified to allow it to control the main armament for A/A fire, and was known as the "3 man modified rangefinder". These ships used the Fuze Keeping Clock HA Fire Control Computer.

The N class were ordered in 1940 as repeats of the J design, after delays and cost over-runs associated with the larger and more complicated . The only design change was to locate the 'X' 4.7-inch mounting in the more logical position with the 20° training blindspot forward. While building, the same early wartime modifications as the Js and Ks were applied, with a pair of twin power-operated 0.5 in machine gun turrets briefly carried on the quarterdeck before being replaced by single 20 mm Oerlikons.

Modifications
In 1940 and 1941, to improve the anti-aircraft capabilities, all ships had their aft torpedo tubes removed and replaced with a single 4 inch gun QF Mark V on a HA Mark III mounting. The relatively ineffective multiple  machine guns were replaced with a single 20 mm Oerlikon, with a further pair added abreast the searchlight platform amidships. The high-speed destroyer mine sweeps were replaced with a rack and two throwers for 45 depth charges and a Type 286 Radar air warning was added at the masthead alongside Type 285 fire control on the H/A rangefinder-director.

In 1942 the 4 in gun was removed and the torpedoes returned to all surviving vessels. The 20 mm Oerlikons were replaced with twin mountings (except those on the quarterdeck) and a Type 291 Radar replaced the Type 286. Jervis, Kelvin, Nerissa and Norman had the searchlight replaced with the "lantern" for centimetric target indication radar Type 271; Javelin and Kimberley having the lighter Type 272 fitted at the truck of the foremast. Napier, Nizam and Norseman (and later, Norman) had American SG1 Radar fitted at the head of a new lattice foremast, Norman replacing her Type 271 set with a single 40 mm Bofors gun. By the end of the war, the surviving J and K ships carried a lattice mast with a Type 293 radar target indication at the truck and a Type 291 air warning at the head.

Service
Being amongst the Royal Navy's most modern and powerful destroyers at the outbreak of war, they were extensively committed. As a result, losses were heavy. Of 24 ships built 13 were lost (six J, six K and one N class), mostly in the Mediterranean in 1941–1942, although they did serve against the Japanese later in the war. France was expected to deal with most of the enemy threat in the Mediterranean, so the French capitulation resulted in heavy British losses in the Mediterranean as the British were unable to allocate many resources to the region. The remainder were scrapped after the war.

Ships

J class

K class

N class
Note: The N-class destroyers of the Royal Australian Navy were manned and commissioned by the Australians, but remained the property of the British government.

Notes

References

 

 
 
 
 
 
 
 
 
 
 

Destroyer classes
 
Ship classes of the Royal Navy